The 2015–16 season  are Foolad's 14th season in the Persian Gulf Pro League. They competed in the Hazfi Cup which they were eliminated by Esteghlal in Round 4. Foolad is captained by Leonard Mesaric.

Players
Last updated on 21 April 2015

Transfers

In

Out

Pre-season and friendlies

Competitions

Overview

Results summary

Results by round

Matches

References

Iranian football clubs 2015–16 season